Sulfur diimides are chemical compounds of the formula S(NR)2. Structurally, they are the diimine of sulfur dioxide. The parent member, S(NH)2, is of only theoretical interest.  Other derivatives where R is an organic group are stable and useful reagents.

Organic derivatives

A particularly stable derivative is di-t-butylsulfurdiimide.  It is prepared by reaction of tert-butylamine with sulfur dichloride to give the intermediate "S(N-t-Bu)", which decomposes at 60 °C to give the diimide.  A second route to sulfur diimides involve treatment of sulfur tetrafluoride with amines.  A third route involves transimidation of disulfonylsulfodiimide:
S(NSO2Ph)2  +  2 RNH2  →   S(NR)2  +  2 PhSO2NH2

N,N'-Bis(methoxycarbonyl)sulfur diimide (MeO2C-N=S=N-CO2Me) is obtained from methyl carbamate.

Structure, bonding, reactions
These compounds are related to SO2.  They have planar C–N=S=N–C cores with bent C–N=S and N=S=N geometries, and various combinations of E and Z isomers are observed for the two N=S bonds.

Sulfur diimides are electrophilic.  They undergo Diels–Alder reactions with dienes. Organolithium reagents attack at the sulfur to give the corresponding nitrogen anion:
R'Li  +  S(NR)2   →   R'S(NR)(NRLi)
The triimido analogues of sulfite can be generated by treating the sulfur diimides with a metal amide:
4 LiNHBu-t  +  2 S(NBu-t)2   →   2 Li2S(NBu-t)3  +  2 t-BuNH2

See also
 Carbodiimide - the carbon analogue
 Disulfur dinitride
 Bis(trimethylsilyl)sulfur diimide

References

Sulfur(IV) compounds
Functional groups